For Four Orchestras is an album by American jazz saxophonist and composer Anthony Braxton recorded in 1978 and first released on the Arista label a triple LP. The album features a composition by Braxton written for four separate orchestras recorded in quadraphonic sound which was subsequently rereleased on CD on The Complete Arista Recordings of Anthony Braxton released by Mosaic Records in 2008.

Background
Composition No. 82 for four orchestras was part of a planned series of multi-orchestral pieces which was to include a work for 100 orchestras in four cities, followed by even more ambitious works for orchestras on different planets, and in different star systems and galaxies. Braxton  stated that he was "profoundly inspired" by Karlheinz Stockhausen's Gruppen and Carré, as well as by the works of Iannis Xenakis, but also acknowledged the influence of Kansas City jazz of the 1920s and 1930s. He recalled: "There has always been something special about the reality of different ensembles making music in the same physical universe space that has excited my imagination. It is as if the whole of the universe were swallowed up–leaving us in a sea of music and color.

Braxton described Composition No. 82 as having to do with "the factoring of distance," and stated that his goal was to "create a sound environment like star systems." The orchestras are placed in corners of the auditorium, arranged at different levels, with the audience situated in the middle, and both the musicians and the audience sit on swivel chairs. The four conductors are linked by television monitors, which are also used by the musicians when they are asked to swivel away from their group's conductor.

The recording took place at Oberlin Conservatory, and involved student musicians with four faculty members as conductors. The project presented a number of challenges, ranging from the need to copy 160 parts plus four conductor scores, to the process of having to assemble nearly a thousand brief recorded segments in order to construct a master tape. In the end, only two-thirds of the work was recorded, and Braxton eliminated another thirty minutes in order to maintain sound quality on the LPs.

Reception

The AllMusic review by Brian Olewnick awarded the album 1½ stars, stating "the results don't live up to expectations. 'Composition 82' is written in an extremely dry academic style with little differentiation of its course... the musical material itself sounds routinely dreary and uninspired, as if Braxton was declaring that he too could write music as sterile and vapid as his European contemporaries. One might more charitably, however, write this effort off as an interesting experiment that failed; ideas appear herein that would bear far more beautiful fruit in later works".

Reviewing the rereleased recordings for All About Jazz, Clifford Allen observed "The work moves in cycles based around single chords... there is an affinity for instrumental flurries presenting themselves in relation to a steady and central pulse... one never gets the sense of an overbearing sonic weight. Rather, each orchestra operates as a separate but interactive living organism, conducted and arranged in specific relation to the others... Braxton's Four Orchestras expand a color field without pushing those colors too far out of the canvas' edges".

Writing for Point of Departure, Art Lange called the piece "a remarkable, audacious, dazzling, dizzying achievement," and praised its "epic scope." In a review of the 2008 reissue, he commented: "While it still requires a serious commitment on the part of the listener, 40 years of Braxton's music have prepared us to hear For Four Orchestras in a new light, and recognize its value in a broader context than was previously possible."

Track listing
All compositions by Anthony Braxton.

 "308M-64 / 30 / C4DM(R)- Z (For Four Orchestras) [Composition 82]" - 114:

Personnel

References

Arista Records albums
Anthony Braxton albums
1978 albums
Albums produced by Michael Cuscuna